Biren Jyoti Mohanty is an Indian film editor.

Career 
Biren is a film editor in Bollywood, he is known for editing Luck and Jodi Breakers.

Editor

References

External links
 

Hindi film editors
Living people
Punjabi film editors
Odia film editors
Film editors from Maharashtra
Artists from Mumbai
Year of birth missing (living people)